The Big Sheep is an amusement farm park located in Abbotsham, Devon, England.

The site was originally Barton Farm, a busy sheep farm owned by six generations of the same family. Due to challenges in the farming community, owner Rick Turner decided to bring in more profits by turning the farm into an attraction in 1988. The site started with an animal park and restaurant. After its initial focus on agriculture yielded disappointing returns, the park began to add entertainment attractions as well.  The park gained attention for its daily sheep races. The park suffered substantial losses in the 2001 outbreak of foot-and-mouth disease.  In 2012 the park drew attention when Turner claimed that "needlessly pessimistic" weather forecasts by the Met Office were driving tourists away from local attractions. It also gained more exposure in March 2016 when it launched its new roller coaster but erected signs to state "no screaming" after complaints were made by local residents during the planning process.

Attractions
The Big Sheep features an indoor playground, animal shows, brewery, gin distillery, animal barn, Battlefield Live laser tag, outdoor playground, shops and 2 restaurants. There are also currently 8 rides including a roller coaster, farm safari ride, train ride, twister ride, piggy pull along, swan pedalos, tractor school, carousel and pony rides.

During the first few months of the roller coaster's operation in 2016, it was named "The Big One". It is now named "Rampage". The roller coaster was made by Zierer and was formerly located at Metroland, the defunct indoor amusement park of the MetroCentre shopping centre in Gateshead.

Throughout the year the park also hosts many live events.

References

External links
 

Amusement parks in England
Buildings and structures in Devon
Tourist attractions in Devon
1988 establishments in England